Reinhold Schünzel (7 November 1888 – 11 November 1954) was a German actor and director, active in both Germany and the United States. The son of a German father and a Jewish mother, he was born in St. Pauli, the poorest part of Hamburg. Despite being of Jewish ancestry, Schünzel was allowed by the Nazis to continue making films for several years until he eventually left in 1937 to live abroad.

Life in Germany
Reinhold Schünzel (or Schuenzel) started his career as an actor in 1915 with a role in the film Werner Krafft. He directed his first film in 1918's Mary Magdalene and in 1920 directed The Girl from Acker Street and Catherine the Great. He was one of Germany's best-known silent film stars after World War I, a period during which films were significantly influenced by the consequences of the war. Schünzel performed in both comedies and dramas, often appearing as a villain or a powerful and corrupt man.

He was influenced by filmmakers such as his mentor Richard Oswald and Ernst Lubitsch, for whom he worked as an actor in the film Madame Du Barry in 1919.

Schünzel's work was very popular in Germany and the Nazi regime gave him the title of Ehrenarier or Honorary Aryan, allowing him to continue to direct and act despite his Jewish heritage (his mother was Jewish). He found that the government, first under Kaiser Wilhelm II and later under Adolf Hitler, interfered with his film projects, compelling him to leave in 1937. Schuenzel described both the Kaiser and Hitler "persons of recognized authority and the worst possible dramatic taste."

Moving to the United States, he worked in Hollywood, playing Nazis and scientists. One of many examples was the film The Hitler Gang (1944), directed by John Farrow. Made in the style of a gangster film, it depicts the rise of Hitler from a small political adventurer to the dictator of Germany. Reinhold Schünzel played the role of General Erich Ludendorff.

Family
Schünzel had a daughter Marianne Stewart, who was born in Berlin, Germany and followed her father by becoming an actress. She appeared in Broadway plays and was known for The Facts of Life (1960), Hush...Hush, Sweet Charlotte (1964), and Time Table (1956).

Schünzel in the United States
Schünzel came to the United States in 1937, and began his American career in Hollywood at Metro-Goldwyn-Mayer. Among the films he directed were Rich Man, Poor Girl (1938), Ice Follies (1939), Balalaika (1939), and New Wine (1941). He also acted in films like The Hitler Gang (1944), Dragonwyck (1946), and The Vicious Circle (1948), among others. His most memorable performance was as Dr. Anderson, a Nazi conspirator, in the film Notorious released in 1946. Schünzel went to New York in 1945 to make a debut on Broadway. He acted in Temper the Wind in 1946 and Montserrat in 1949.

Among the prizes he received was the Federal West German Film prize for the best supporting role in the movie My Father's Horses.
He became a U.S citizen in 1943 and he returned to Germany in 1949. Schünzel died of a heart attack in Munich, Germany. Before returning to Germany, he starred in the 1949 Clifford Odets Broadway play The Big Knife.

Filmography

German films

 The Grehn Case (1916) as Kriminalrat Rat Anheim
 Der Fall Hoop (1916) as Kriminalrat Anheim
 Bubi Is Jealous (1916) as Hellmut Hartleben
 Werner Krafft (1916) as Heinz Kleinschmidt
 The Confessions of the Green Mask (1916)
 The Uncanny House (1916, 3 parts) as Engelbert Fox / Ralph Robin, Privatdetektiv
 His Coquettish Wife (1916)
 Die Stricknadeln (1916)
 The Knitting Needles (1916)
 Under the Spell of Silence (1916)
 Your Dearest Enemy (1916)
 Benjamin the Timid (1916)
 The Night Talk (1917)
 The Newest Star of Variety (1917)
 The Coquette (1917) as Tertianer Rolf
 The Unmarried Woman (1917)
 The Lord of Hohenstein (1917)
 Mountain Air (1917) as Von Storch
 The Bracelet (1918) as Hausfreund
 Countess Kitchenmaid (1918) as Der Schüchterne
 Put to the Test (1918) as Reichsgraf Adolar von Warowingen
 In the Castle by the Lake (1918) as Erich von Strehsen
 Cain (1918)
 Spring Storms (1918) as Reinhold, Neffe von Königswart
 Midnight (1918) as Dick Tillinghaft, Reporter
 The Mirror of the World (1918) as Konkurrent
 The Ballet Girl (1918) as Eduard Stutzig, Lebemann
 Diary of a Lost Woman (1918) as Graf Kasimir Osdorff
 Let There Be Light (1918) as Fabrikbesitzer Kallenbach
 Film Kathi (1918)
 Crown and Whip (1919)
 Liebe, die sich frei verschenkt (1919)
 Prostitution (1919) as Karl Döring
 Around the World in Eighty Days (1919) as Archibald Corsican
 Different from the Others (1919) as Franz Bollek
 One or the Other (1919)
 The Carousel of Life (1919)
 The Apache of Marseilles (1919) as Apache Badinguet
 Hedda's Revenge (1919) as Georg
 The Peruvian (1919) as Egon Hartenstein
 A Night in Paradise (1919) as Ede
 Seelenverkäufer (1919) as Orville
 Blonde Poison (1919) as Adolf Reiss
 Die Prostitution, 2. Teil - Die sich verkaufen (1919)
 The Secret of Wera Baranska (1919)
 Madame Du Barry (1919) as Minister Choiseul
 Madness (1919) as Jörges
 Seine Beichte (Bekenntnisse eines Lebemannes) (1919) as Achim von Wellinghausen
 During My Apprenticeship (1919) as Axel von Rambow
 Unheimliche Geschichten (1919) as Der Teufel (framing story) / Former husband (ep.1) / Murderer (ep,2) / Drunk (ep.3) / Artur Silas, detective (ep.4) / Travelling Baron (ep.5)
 Lilli's Marriage (1919) as Dr. Goldmann
 Lilli (1919) as Dr. Goldmann
 Die schwarze Marion (1919)
 The Duty to Live (1919)
 The Devil and the Madonna (1919)
 Was Den Männern Gefällt (1919)
 Love (1919) as Herbert Warfield
 Fieber (1919)
 Was den Männern gefällt (1919)
 The Rose of the Flyer (1919)
 The Loves of Käthe Keller (1919) as Erbprinz Ottokar
 The Girl and the Men (1919)
 The Secret of the American Docks (1919) as Corbett, Reisender
 Baccarat (1919)
 The Count of Cagliostro (1920) as Cagliostro
 Figures of the Night (1920) as Sekretär
 Dancer of Death (1920)
 Mary Magdalene (1920, director) as Leonhard
 The Dancer Barberina (1920) as Prinz von Carignan
 The Girl from Acker Street (1920, director)
 The Prisoner (1920) as Französischer Lagerkommandant
 Three Nights (1920) as Verbrecher
 The Bandits of Asnières (1920) as Jean, der Apache
 Moriturus (1920)
 Catherine the Great (1920, director) as Tsar Peter
 The Chameleon (1920)
 Christian Wahnschaffe (1920)
 The Anti-Detective (1920)
 The Last Hour (1921)
 The Story of a Maid (1921)
 Deceiver of the People (1921, director)
 Lady Hamilton (1921) as Ferdinand IV, König von Neapel
 Money in the Streets (1922) as Harry Lister
 Luise Millerin (1922) as Hofmarschall Kalb
 Bigamy (1922) as Alexandroff
 The Love Nest (1922) as Lothar von Brandt
 The Three Marys (1923) as Don Juan de la Marana
 The Treasure of Gesine Jacobsen (1923) as Rasmussen
 The Misanthrope (1923)
 Adam and Eve (1923) as Schieber
 The Slipper Hero (1923)
 The New Land (1924)
 Strong Winds  (1924, director)
 Battle of the Butterflies (1924) as Richard Keßler, Reisender
 A Woman for 24 Hours (1925, director)
 Rags and Silk (1925) as Max
 The Marriage Swindler (1925)
 Flight Around the World (1925) as Louis Renard
 The Flower Girl of Potsdam Square (1925) as Stiefelputzer
 Der Flug um den Erdball, 2. Teil - Indien, Europa (1925)
 The Salesgirl from the Fashion Store (1925)
 Cock of the Roost (1925) as Peter Abendrot
 Den of Iniquity (1925) as Emil Stiebel
 Zwischen zwei Frauen (1925)
 The Pride of the Company (1926) as Wilhelm, der Stolz der Kompagnie
 Tea Time in the Ackerstrasse (1926)
 Circus Romanelli (1926) as Der dumme August
 We'll Meet Again in the Heimat (1926) as Gustav Knospe
 The Imaginary Baron (1927) as Der Juxbaron
 Hello Caesar! (1927) as Caesar, Artist
 Heaven on Earth (1927) as Traugott Bellmann
 Always Be True and Faithful (1927) as Orje Duff
 Gesetze der Liebe (1927)
 Herkules Maier (1928) as Stadtreisender Herkules Maier
 Don Juan in a Girls' School (1928, director) as Dr. Eckehart Bleibtreu
 Adam and Eve (1928) as Adam Grünau
 You Walk So Softly (1928, director) as Gustav Mond
 From a Bachelor's Diary (1929) as Franz
 Peter the Mariner (1929) as Peter Sturz
 Column X (1929) as Robert Sandt, Führer der Kolonne X
 Love in the Ring (1930) (uncredited)
 Phantoms of Happiness (1930, director)
 1914 (1931) as Czar Nicholas II
 Ronny (1931, director) (German-language version)
 Ronny (1931, director) (French-language version)
 The Little Escapade (1931, director)
 The Threepenny Opera (1931) as Tiger Brown
 Her Grace Commands (1931) as Staatsminister Graf Herlitz
 Le Bal (1931) as Alfred Kampf (French-language version)
  (1931) as Alfred Kampf (German-language version)
 How Shall I Tell My Husband? (1932, director)
 Le petit écart (1932, director)
 The Beautiful Adventure (1932, director)
 The Beautiful Adventure (1932, director)
 Victor and Victoria (1933, writer and director)
 Season in Cairo (1933, director)
 Idylle au Caire (1933, director)
 The English Marriage (1934, director)
 George and Georgette (1934, director)
 Die Töchter ihrer Exzellenz (1934, director)
 La jeune fille d'une nuit (1934, director)
 Amphitryon (1935, writer and director)
 Les dieux s'amusent (1935, director)
 The Girl Irene (1936, director)
 Donogoo Tonka (1936, director)
 Donogoo (1936, director)
 Land of Love (1937, director)
 Die Stimme Reichstag's (1949) as Himself

American films
 Rich Man, Poor Girl (1938, director)
 The Ice Follies of 1939 (1939, director)
 Balalaika (1939, director)
 The Great Awakening (1941, director)
 Hangmen Also Die! (1943) as Gestapo Insp. Ritter
 First Comes Courage (1943) as Col. Kurt von Elser
 Hostages (1943) as Kurt Daluege
 The Hitler Gang (1944) as Gen. Ludendorff
 The Man in Half Moon Street (1945) as Dr. Kurt van Bruecken
 Dragonwyck (1946) as Count De Grenier (uncredited)
 Notorious (1946) as Dr. Anderson
 Plainsman and the Lady (1946) as Michael H. Arnesen
 Golden Earrings (1947) as Prof. Otto Krosigk
 Berlin Express (1948) as Walther
 The Vicious Circle (1948) as Baron Arady
 Washington Story (1952) as Peter Kralik

West German films
 The Dubarry (1951, director)
 Meines Vaters Pferde I. Teil Lena und Nicoline (1954) as Konsul Rittinghaus
 Meines Vaters Pferde, 2. Teil: Seine dritte Frau (1954) as Konsul Rittinghaus
 A Love Story (1954) as Schlumberger, Schauspieldirektor (final film role)

References

External links 
 

1886 births
1954 deaths
American male film actors
Film directors from Hamburg
German male film actors
German male silent film actors
American film directors
Jewish emigrants from Nazi Germany to the United States
Jewish American male actors
20th-century American male actors
20th-century German male actors
Male actors from Hamburg
People from Hamburg-Mitte